Yandaran is a rural town and locality in the Bundaberg Region, Queensland, Australia. In the  the locality of Yandaran had a population of 463 people.

Geography 
Although predominantly inland, the north-east boundary of the locality is the Coral Sea. The North Coast railway line passes through the locality from the east, past the town and exits the locality to the north. The town is served by the Yandaran railway station, while there are two other stations Littabella and Takoka serving the northern part of the locality.

History 
The name Yandaran was probably first applied to the railway station and is believed to be an Aboriginal name meaning watershed.

Yandaran Creek Provisional School opened on 14 September 1886, becoming Yandaran Creek State School on 1 January 1909. Due to low student numbers, it closed on 31 December 1942, but reopened on 1 May 1944. It closed permanently on 28 January 1957.

Yandaran State School opened on 7 Apr 1919.

Littebella Creek Provisional School opened on 1899. On 1 January 1909 it became Littebella Creek State School. It closed circa 1935.

In the  the locality of Yandaran had a population of 463 people.

Education 
Yandaran State School is a government primary (Prep-6) school for boys and girls at School Lane. In 2016, the school had an enrolment of 25 students with 3 teachers (2 full-time equivalent) and 5 non-teaching staff (2 full-time equivalent). In 2018, the school had an enrolment of 23 students with 3 teachers (2 full-time equivalent) and 10 non-teaching staff (3 full-time equivalent).

Community groups 
The Yandaran branch of the Queensland Country Women's Association meets at the QCWA Hall at 21 Main Street.

References

External links 

 Town map of Yandaran, 1982

Towns in Queensland
Bundaberg Region
Coastline of Queensland
Localities in Queensland